Michael Anthony Sisson (born 24 November 1978) is an English former professional footballer who played in the Football League for Mansfield Town.

References

1978 births
Living people
English footballers
Association football midfielders
English Football League players
Mansfield Town F.C. players
Ilkeston Town F.C. (1945) players